OMGP can refer to

 In the context of ultra-high-energy cosmic ray the Oh my God particle
 The series On My Great Predecessors written by former world chess champion Garry Kasparov